Martavis Alexander Bryant (born December 20, 1991) is an American gridiron football wide receiver for the Vegas Vipers of the XFL. He played college football at Clemson, and was drafted by the Pittsburgh Steelers in the fourth round of the 2014 NFL Draft.

High school career
Bryant was born in Calhoun Falls, South Carolina. In high school, Bryant was a standout football player for two schools. He attended Calhoun Falls High School in South Carolina and transferred to T. L. Hanna High School in Anderson, South Carolina prior to his senior year because Calhoun Falls High was shut down due to low student numbers from a small town. He was named first-team all-state as a senior recording 70 receptions for 722 yards and 11 touchdowns. He had 44 catches for 776 yards and six touchdowns as a junior.
 
Considered a four-star recruit by Rivals.com, he was rated the 10th best wide receiver prospect in the nation. After high school, he spent one year at Hargrave Military Academy in Chatham, Virginia to pass NCAA initial eligibility standards
 
As a standout sprinter, Bryant ran for the T. L. Hanna track team. He finished 2nd in the 100 meters at the Regional Class 1 AAAA championships, with a time of 10.85 seconds. He also won the 200 meters at the 2010 Region 1-4A Meet, recording a personal-best time of 21.46 seconds.

College career

Freshman season
Bryant began attending Clemson University in 2011. Coming into Clemson, he had to compete with future NFL players, Sammy Watkins, DeAndre Hopkins, and Jaron Brown. His first reception was for 54 yards against Troy on September 3. The next week, he had his first career touchdown, a 42-yard reception while playing Wofford. His first career start was against No. 10 Virginia Tech on October 1, 2011. He also played in his first bowl game, against No. 22 West Virginia in the Orange Bowl. In that game, he caught two passes for 20 yards. He completed his first season with two starts in 14 games. He finished 2011 with nine receptions, 220 receiving yards, and two touchdowns.

Sophomore season
After his first season, Bryant's production increased. Against Ball State, he would have a 22-yard touchdown catch, a 17-yard carry, and three kickoff returns for 69 yards. He would finish this game leading the Tigers with 108 all purpose yards. For the season, he would show little improvement, having career highs with 10 receptions, 305 receiving yards, and 4 touchdown catches. He would lead the entire FBS with 30.5 yards per a reception.

Junior season
His junior season marked the best year in his college career. While playing against No. 5 Georgia, he recovered the game winning onside kick. Against North Carolina State, he had 6 receptions for 73 yards. On November 14, against Georgia Tech, he had a career-high 176 receiving yards, on five catches, for one touchdown. In his second Orange Bowl against No. 6 Ohio State he had three catches, 28 receiving yards, and two touchdowns, marking a career-high. He finished 2013 with 42 receptions, 828 receiving yards, and seven touchdown receptions making his career totals, 61 receptions, 1,354 receiving yards, and 13 touchdowns.

Bryant announced on January 5, 2014, that he would forgo his senior season and enter the 2014 NFL Draft.

Professional career
Coming out of Clemson, Bryant was projected to be drafted anywhere from the second to fourth round by the majority of NFL analysts and scouts. Bryant received an invitation to the NFL Combine and completed all the required combine drills and positional drills for team representatives and scouts. On March 6, 2014, he participated at Clemson's Pro Day and chose to only perform positional drills. He was ranked as the 14th best wide receiver prospect available in the draft by NFLDraftScout.com and was ranked the 13th best wide receiver by NFL analyst Mike Mayock.

Pittsburgh Steelers
The Pittsburgh Steelers selected Bryant in the fourth round (118th overall) of the 2014 NFL Draft. He was the 19th wide receiver selected in the 2014 NFL Draft. On June 9, 2014, he signed a four-year contract with the team worth $2.659 million with $439,220 guaranteed and a $439,220 signing bonus.

2014 season: Rookie year
Bryant spent the first six weeks of the season inactive due to a shaky training camp and preseason in addition to suffering a mild A/C sprain in the last preseason game. Head coach Mike Tomlin told Bryant he wanted to see him dominate the scout team in practice before he would activate him for a game. Bryant was finally activated for a Week 7 matchup against the Houston Texans. His first NFL reception went for a 35-yard touchdown and he finished the game with two catches for 40 yards. On October 26, 2014, he hauled in a season-high five catches for 83 yards and two touchdowns in a 51–34 victory over the Indianapolis Colts. On November 2, 2014, Bryant received his first career start against the Baltimore Ravens and ended the game with three receptions, 44 receiving yards, and two touchdown receptions. His five touchdown receptions set an NFL record for a player in their first three games. During a Week 10 contest at the New York Jets, he had four receptions for a season-high 143-yards and had an 80-yard touchdown catch. This marked his sixth touchdown in first four games and again set an NFL record, which was later tied by Calvin Ridley.

On December 28, 2014, Bryant caught a 21-yard touchdown reception in a 27–17 win over the Cincinnati Bengals. He played in his first NFL postseason game on January 3, 2015, against the Baltimore Ravens. He finished the 17–30 loss with five receptions for 61 yards and a touchdown.

Bryant finished his rookie year with 26 receptions for 549 receiving yards and eight touchdowns in ten games and three starts. Bryant's 21.1 yards per reception ranked first among NFL wide receivers in 2014.

2015 season

On August 27, 2015, Bryant was suspended the first four games due to violating the league's substance abuse policy. During his suspension, he spent time at a rehabilitation center in Houston, Texas and worked with ex-NBA coach John Lucas. Although he was available to return for Week 5, he missed the game due to a knee injury, so he made his 2015 debut on October 18, 2015. In a 25–13 victory over the Arizona Cardinals, he caught six passes for 137 yards and two touchdowns including an 88-yard touchdown. His first start of the season was on October 25, 2015, at the Kansas City Chiefs, and in his second game he caught three receptions for 45 yards and a touchdown. During a Week 10 matchup against the Cleveland Browns, Bryant had a season-high 178 receiving yards on six catches while also scoring a 64-yard touchdown. On December 13, 2015, he caught a season-high seven receptions for 49 yards in a 33–20 victory over the Bengals. In Week 15, he made a season-high ten catches for 87 yards in a 34–27 win over the Denver Broncos, making it the first time he caught over nine passes in his career.

On January 9, 2016, against the Cincinnati Bengals in the Wild Card Round, while in the red zone, quarterback Ben Roethlisberger threw a pass into the corner of the endzone intended for Bryant. During the process of the catch, he did a front flip and maintained control of the ball while holding it on the back of his leg throughout the flip. The NFL VP of officiating later deemed this should not have been ruled a catch. This score gave the Steelers a 15–0 lead en route to winning the game by a score of 18–16. In the Divisional Round against the Broncos, Bryant had nine receptions for 154 yards and also rushed for 40 yards in the 23–16 defeat.

2016 season
On March 14, 2016, the NFL announced it had suspended Bryant for the entire 2016 NFL season for violating the league's substance abuse policy.

2017 season
On April 25, 2017, Bryant was conditionally reinstated by the NFL. He entered the regular season as the starting wide receiver alongside Antonio Brown. In the Steelers' season-opening victory against the Cleveland Browns, Bryant caught two passes for 14 yards. The following week, he caught three passes for 91 receiving yards and his first touchdown of the season on a 27-yard pass from Ben Roethlisberger as the Steelers defeated the Minnesota Vikings 26–9. However, following the Week 7 game against the Cincinnati Bengals, Bryant vented frustration about his lack of role in the offense on social media, and then skipped mandatory team meetings the following Monday. Bryant then publicly told ESPN he would like to be traded; however, coach Mike Tomlin said the team had no plans to trade Bryant. On October 25, 2017, prior to that week's game against the Detroit Lions, the Steelers demoted Bryant to the scout team and replaced him with JuJu Smith-Schuster after deactivating him for the game. As of November 1, 2017, Bryant was promoted back onto the first-team for the following game against the Indianapolis Colts.

Bryant finished the 2017 season with 50 receptions for 603 yards and three touchdowns. The Steelers made the playoffs and faced off against the Jacksonville Jaguars in the Divisional Round. In the 45–42 loss, he had two receptions for 78 yards and a touchdown.

Oakland Raiders
On April 26, 2018, the Steelers traded Bryant to the Oakland Raiders for Oakland's third round pick previously acquired from the Arizona Cardinals (79th overall) in the 2018 NFL Draft.

On September 1, 2018, Bryant was released by the Raiders. Despite facing a possible year-long suspension by the NFL for a violation of the league's drug policy during the off-season, the Raiders re-signed him to a one-year deal ten days later. He played in eight games, recording 19 catches for 266 yards and no touchdowns, before being placed on injured reserve on December 5, 2018, with a knee injury. On December 14, 2018, the NFL suspended Bryant indefinitely for violating the terms of his conditional reinstatement. Bryant applied for reinstatement in 2019.

Toronto Argonauts
On January 25, 2021, Bryant signed with the Toronto Argonauts of the Canadian Football League. He was placed on the suspended list on July 10, 2021, after failing to report for training camp. Bryant never played for the Argos and after the season he was released on December 23, 2021.

Edmonton Elks
The Edmonton Elks announced that they had signed Bryant on February 28, 2022. Bryant was released by the Elks on May 3, 2022, before training camp began.

FCF
On April 29, The FCF Beasts recruited Bryant to the team.

Vegas Vipers
With the 5th pick in the 2023 XFL Skill Players Draft, Bryant was selected by the Vegas Vipers.

Career statistics

Personal life
Clemson began recruiting Bryant when he was a freshman in high school. He verbally committed to them during his second year of high school. He also has amassed many tattoos including the NFL shield logo on his abdomen to remind him he was drafted in the fourth round and to keep himself motivated. His cousin is former Clemson quarterback and former Toronto Argonauts teammate Kelly Bryant.

References

External links

1991 births
Living people
People from Calhoun Falls, South Carolina
Players of American football from South Carolina
African-American players of American football
American football wide receivers
Clemson Tigers football players
Pittsburgh Steelers players
Oakland Raiders players
Doping cases in American football
Toronto Argonauts players
Edmonton Elks players
Fan Controlled Football players
Vegas Vipers players
21st-century African-American sportspeople